Immanuel Lutheran College, located in Eau Claire, Wisconsin since 1963, is a high school, college, and seminary campus of the Church of the Lutheran Confession.

History 
Immanuel Lutheran College began in 1959 in Mankato, Minnesota, where it was founded by Immanuel Lutheran Church. Student originally took secular courses at Minnesota State University and religion courses at the college. It was incorporated into the Church of the Lutheran Confession in 1961, and a new building was constructed in Eau Claire, Wisconsin, in 1963, where classes began in September of that year.

High school 
Immanuel Lutheran High School enrolls 110-120 students in grades 9-12 each year, making it the largest section of Immanuel's three levels of schooling. The school is residential, and students take traditional high school courses along with religion classes. The high school also offers various athletic and extracurricular events for students.

College 
Immanuel Lutheran College is also residential, and it offers 4 degrees:

 Associate of Arts in Liberal Arts
 Bachelor of Science in Elementary Education
 Bachelor of Arts in Pre-Theology
 Bachelor of Arts in Religious Studies

They also have a college choir, which has had small tours in the United States performing at CLC churches.

Seminary 
Immanuel Lutheran Seminary is a three-year seminary program which exists to train men as pastors for CLC-associated churches. The seminary does not enroll women.

Campus 
The college sits on 80 acres of land and is composed of several buildings, including the Academic Center, Ingram Hall (seminary building), 3 dormitories (segregated by gender), and the Commons. The school also has a field house near its athletic fields, and a set of 10 houses for professors called Prof Row.

References

External links
Official website

Private universities and colleges in Wisconsin
Private high schools in Wisconsin
Lutheranism in Wisconsin
Educational institutions established in 1963
Buildings and structures in Eau Claire, Wisconsin
Lutheran universities and colleges in the United States
Education in Eau Claire County, Wisconsin
Schools in Eau Claire County, Wisconsin
1963 establishments in Wisconsin
Lutheran seminaries